Lake Abakrytseli or Abakrytsele is a lake in the Braslau Lakes National Park of northern Belarus.

References
Блакітная кніга Беларусі. — Мн.: БелЭн, 1994.

Abakrytseli